The Sand and The Stars is an album by the Bristol-based band Movietone. It was partly recorded on a beach in Cornwall  Its intention was to sound 'like a jazz record being played from across the bay'.  This was inspired by a review of their previous album ('the blossom filled streets'), which had described their music that way.

Critical reception
In 2015, upon including "Ocean Song" in their "Pitchfork Essentials" list "Harder Shade of Dark: The Sound of Bristol Post-Rock", Pitchfork Media described The Sand and the Stars as "a musical secret ripe for rediscovery, lying there gathering digital dust until its moment finally arrives."

Track listing
"The Sand and the Stars" — 2:43
 Kate Wright - vocals, guitar, lyrics
 Matt Jones - guitar
 Tom Cops - piano
 Annie Wright - paws
"Ocean Song" — 5:02
 Kate Wright - vocals, guitar, lyrics
 George McKenzie - tenor saxophone
 Sam Jones - guitar
 Tom Cops - banjo
 Chris Cole - Fender Rhodes electric piano, trumpet
 Rachel Coe - bass
 Matt Jones - drums

"In Mexico" — 5:00
 Kate Wright - guitar, vocals, lyrics
 Rachel Coe - guitar, vocals, lyrics
 Matt Jones - banjo
 Chris Cole - double bass, cello
 Sam Jones - drums
"Pale Tracks" — 4:06
 Sam Jones - guitar, lead vocals, wine glasses, lyrics
 Chris Cole - accordion, wine glasses
 Rachel Coe - piano, backing vocals
 Katie Wright - cello, backing vocals
 Matt Jones - drums, backing vocals

"Let Night In" — 3:52
 Rachel Coe - vocals, piano, clarinet, lyrics
 John Coe - guitar, lyrics
"We Rode On" — 3:48

 Kate Wright - vocals, guitar, lyrics
 Michael Davies - trumpet
 Lisa Brook - clarinet
 Rachel Coe - clarinet
 George McKenzie - bass saxophone
 Tom Cops - banjo
 John Coe - guitar
 Sam Jones - guitar
 Chris Cole - cello
 Matt Jones - lyrics
"Snow is Falling" — 4:25
 Kate Wright - guitar, lead vocals, lyrics
 Rachel Coe - clarinet, backing vocals
 Chris Cole - cello, backing vocals
 Matt Jones - double bass, backing vocals
 Sam Jones - drums, backing vocals
"Not Even Close" — 1:47
 Kate Wright - guitar
 Sam Jones - guitar
 Rachel Coe - organ
 Matt Jones - drums
"Red Earth" — 4:08
 Kate Wright - cello, vocals, lyrics
 Matt Jones - drums, vocals, organ, lyrics
 George McKenzie - tenor saxophone
 Sam Jones - guitar
 Tom Cops - banjo
"Beach Samba" — 2:57
 Michael Davies - trumpet
 Lisa Brook - clarinet
 Rachel Coe - clarinet
 George McKenzie - tenor saxophone
 John Coe - guitar
 Sam Jones - guitar
 Tom Cops - banjo
 Kate Wright - double bass, vocals, lyrics
 Matt Jones- drums, lyrics
"Near Marconi's Hut" — 1:25
 Kate Wright - guitar, vocals

Release history

References

2003 albums